Dzień Dobry Wakacje (Eng. Good Morning Holidays) is a Polish morning show, spin-off of Dzień Dobry TVN. It is broadcast in July and August at weekends from 8:30 to 11:00. The first show aired on 3 July 2010 on TVN. Dzień Dobry Wakacje is presented by Dzień Dobry TVN presenters and various guest presenters.

In 2020 the show's theme music is  the same as Dzień Dobry TVN . Earlier it was a song  Sunny Day.

Hosts

List of episodes

Summer 2010 
In 2010 Dzień Dobry Wakacje was broadcast from 3 July to 28 August on Saturdays between 9:00 and 11:30.

Summer 2011 
In 2011 the show was broadcast from 2 July on Saturdays and Sundays between 8:30 and 11:00.

2012
In 2012, the show premiered on 1 July and is broadcast every Sunday from 8:30 to 11:00.

2013
In 2013, the show premiered on 30 June and is broadcast every Sunday from 8:30 to 11:00.

Summer 2014 
In 2014 the show was broadcast from 5 July on Saturdays and Sundays between 8:30 and 11:00.

Summer 2015 
In 2015 the show was broadcast from 27 June on Saturdays and Sundays between 8:30 and 11:00.

Summer 2016 
In 2016 the show was broadcast from 27 June on Saturdays and Sundays between 8:30 and 11:00.

Polish television shows
2010 Polish television series debuts
TVN (Polish TV channel) original programming